Justin Junior Mengolo (born 24 June 1993) is a Cameroonian professional footballer who plays as a winger or forward for Jordanian club Al-Salt.

Club career
Mengolo started his career in Cameroon with Panthère du Ndé, before moving onto Tunisian football to sign for Étoile du Sahel. One goal in fifteen appearances followed in Tunisian Ligue Professionnelle 1 for Mengolo before he left to join Cypriot First Division club Omonia in 2013. In January 2014, he departed as he joined fellow Cypriot top-tier side Nea Salamina on loan. He scored five times in seventeen appearances in Cyprus for the two aforementioned teams prior to leaving to complete a move to Universitatea Cluj in Romania's Liga I.

In January 2016, Mengolo joined Levski Sofia in Bulgaria but left five months later. He was a free agent from July 2016 to January 2017 when he signed for Nemzeti Bajnokság I side Debrecen. He left the team at the end of the 2017/18 season.

On 28 September 2018, Mengolo signed for Romanian club Astra Giurgiu.

In December 2018, Mengolo signed for Maltese Premier League leaders, Gzira United FC. In February 2020, Mengolo then moved to Al-Salt in Jordan.

International career
Mengolo has won two caps for the Cameroon national team, both caps came in June 2015.

Career statistics

Club

Honours

Club
Étoile du Sahel
Tunisian Cup: 2011–12

References

External links
 
 
 

1993 births
Living people
Cameroonian footballers
Cameroonian expatriate footballers
Tunisian Ligue Professionnelle 1 players
Cypriot First Division players
Liga I players
First Professional Football League (Bulgaria) players
Nemzeti Bajnokság I players
Maltese Premier League players
Étoile Sportive du Sahel players
AC Omonia players
Nea Salamis Famagusta FC players
FC Universitatea Cluj players
PFC Levski Sofia players
Debreceni VSC players
FC Astra Giurgiu players
Gżira United F.C. players
Footballers from Yaoundé
African Games bronze medalists for Cameroon
African Games medalists in football
Panthère du Ndé players
Jordanian Pro League players
Al-Salt SC players
Association football forwards
Competitors at the 2011 All-Africa Games
Expatriate footballers in Tunisia
Expatriate footballers in Cyprus
Expatriate footballers in Romania
Expatriate footballers in Bulgaria
Expatriate footballers in Malta
Expatriate footballers in Jordan
Cameroonian expatriate sportspeople in Tunisia
Cameroonian expatriate sportspeople in Romania
Cameroonian expatriate sportspeople in Bulgaria
Cameroonian expatriate sportspeople in Malta
Cameroonian expatriate sportspeople in Jordan